The 2012 United States House of Representatives elections in North Carolina were held on Tuesday, November 6, 2012, to elect the 13 U.S. representatives from the state of North Carolina. The elections coincided with the U.S. presidential election, N.C. gubernatorial election, statewide judicial elections, Council of State elections and various local elections. Primary elections were held on May 8, 2012; for races in which no candidate received 40 percent of the vote in the primary, runoff elections (officially known as "second" primaries) were held on July 17.

Overview

Redistricting
A redistricting map, drawn to reflect changes observed in the 2010 United States Census, was passed into law in July 2011. The map must receive approval from either the U.S. District Court for the District of Columbia or the U.S. Department of Justice before it can be enforced (under the 1965 Voting Rights Act). The North Carolina chapter of the National Association for the Advancement of Colored People challenged the map on the grounds that it reduces the influence of African American voters.

District 1
Democrat G. K. Butterfield, who has represented North Carolina's 1st congressional district since 2004, ran for re-election. The 1st district, which is majority-minority and already strongly favored Democrats, favored them even more so after redistricting. Butterfield ran against Republican ex-law enforcement officer Pete DiLauro and Libertarian Darryl Holloman in the general election.

Democratic primary

Candidates

Nominee
G. K. Butterfield, incumbent U.S. Representative

Eliminated in primary
Dan Whittacre, High School Teacher, HHS Federal Agent

Primary results

Republican primary

Candidates

Nominee
 Pete DiLauro

General election

Endorsements

Results

District 2
Republican Renee Ellmers, who has represented North Carolina's 2nd congressional district since January 2011, ran for re-election. The 2nd district was made more favorable to Republicans in redistricting, with The Hill ranking Ellmers at second in its list of house members most helped by redistricting.

Brian Irving, a retired US Air Force officer, ran as the Libertarian Party candidate.

Republican primary

Candidates

Nominee
Renee Ellmers, incumbent U.S. Representative

Eliminated in primary
Sonya Holmes
Clement F. Munno
Richard Speer, contract farmer

Primary results

Democratic primary

Candidates

Nominee
Steve Wilkins, retired US Army officer and businessman

Eliminated in primary
Toni Morris, professional counselor

Withdrawn
Jim Bibbs

Declined
 Bob Etheridge, former U.S. Representative (ran for governor)

Primary results

General election

Endorsements

Results

District 3
Republican Walter Jones, Jr., who has represented North Carolina's 3rd congressional district since 1995, ran for re-election. The 3rd district was made slightly more favorable to Democrats in redistricting, but continued to strongly favor Republicans.

Republican primary

Candidates

Nominee
Walter Jones, incumbent U.S. Representative

Eliminated in primary
Frank Palombo, former New Bern police chief

Primary results

Democratic primary

Candidates

Nominee
Erik Anderson, former US Marine

General election

Endorsements

Results

District 4
Democrat David Price, who has represented North Carolina's 4th congressional district since 1997 and previously served from 1987 until 1995, ran for re-election. Brad Miller, who has represented the 13th district since 2003, considered challenging Price in the 4th district primary after having his home drawn into it, but announced in January 2012 that he would not seek either seat and would instead retire. Price was unopposed in the Democratic primary.

Democratic primary

Candidates

Nominee
David Price, incumbent U.S. Representative

Declined
Brad Miller, incumbent U.S. Representative for North Carolina's 13th congressional district

Republican primary

Candidates

Nominee
Tim D'Annunzio, businessman and candidate for North Carolina's 8th congressional district in 2010.

Eliminated in primary
Jim Allen, Electrical contractor
George Hutchins, former US Marine, veteran of the first Gulf War and candidate for this district in 2010

Withdrawn
Doug Yopp, Director of the Friends of the Library at NC State

Primary results

General election

Endorsements

Results

District 5
Republican Virginia Foxx, who has represented North Carolina's 5th congressional district since 2005, ran for re-election. The 5th district was made slightly more favorable to Democrats in redistricting, but continued to strongly favor Republicans.

Republican primary

Candidates

Nominee 
Virginia Foxx, incumbent U.S. Representative

Democratic primary

Candidates

Nominee
Elisabeth Motsinger, Winston-Salem/Forsyth County School Board-member

Eliminated in primary
Bruce Peller, dentist

Withdrawn
 Treva Johnson, Wilkes County Democratic chairwoman

Primary results

General election

Endorsements

Results

District 6
Republican Howard Coble, who has represented North Carolina's 6th congressional district since 1985, ran for re-election.
The 6th district was expected to continue to strongly favor Republicans.

Republican primary

Candidates

Nominee
Howard Coble, incumbent U.S. Representative

Eliminated in primary
Bill Flynn, former radio personality 
Billy Yow, Guilford County Commissioner

Primary results

Democratic primary

Candidates

Nominee
Tony Foriest, former state senator from the 24th district

General election

Endorsements

Results

District 7

The home of Democrat Mike McIntyre, who has represented North Carolina's 7th congressional district since 1997, was drawn into the 8th district in redistricting. McIntyre, who had briefly considered running for governor following Bev Perdue's announcement that she would not seek re-election, decided to seek re-election in the newly redrawn 7th district. The district was made more favorable to Republicans in redistricting: 58% of its residents voted for Republican nominee John McCain in the 2008 presidential election.

Democratic primary

Candidates

Nominee
Mike McIntyre, incumbent U.S. Representative

Republican primary

Candidates

Nominee
David Rouzer, state senator from the 12th district

Eliminated in primary
Randy Crow, Business executive
Ilario Pantano, retired U.S. Marine and nominee for this district in 2010

Withdrawn
Timothy Alan Wilkes

Primary results

General election

Campaign
McIntyre was heavily targeted by Republicans, especially after the GOP-controlled North Carolina General Assembly had redrawn congressional boundaries to put his home in Robeson County into the 8th district, something that McIntyre accused the GOP of doing “solely for the reason of giving my opponent a seat in Congress”. 

Nearly $9 million was spent by both parties, with McIntyre airing ads stating he was a “strong conservative and Christian who walks his faith every day” and Rouzer trying to tie McIntyre to his votes for Nancy Pelosi and for  the stimulus.

Endorsements

McIntyre was the lone Democratic federal candidate endorsed by National Right to Life Committee in this election cycle.

Polling

Predictions

Results
The election outcome left McIntyre the winner by 655 votes. A recount requested by Rouzer began on November 26, 2012; two days later, Rouzer conceded the race to McIntyre.

District 8
Democrat Larry Kissell, who had represented North Carolina's 8th congressional district since 2009, ran for re-election. The home of Kissell's fellow Democrat Mike McIntyre, who has represented the 7th district since 1997, was drawn into the 8th district in redistricting, but McIntyre sought re-election in the 7th district. The 8th district was made more favorable to Republicans in redistricting: only 42% of its residents voted for Democratic nominee Barack Obama in the 2008 presidential election.

Democratic primary

Candidates

Nominee
Larry Kissell, incumbent U.S. Representative

Eliminated in primary
Marcus Williams, attorney and candidate for U.S. Senate in 2008

Primary results

Republican primary

Candidates

Nominee
Richard Hudson, former U.S. Representative Robin Hayes' district director

Eliminated in primary
Scott Keadle, former Iredell County Commissioner 
Vernon Robinson, former Winston-Salem city council member and nominee for the 13th district in 2006 
Fred Steen, state representative
John Whitley, neurosurgeon

Withdrawn
Daniel Barry, insurance executive

Declined
Justin Burr, state representative
Jerry Dockham, state representative
Pat Molamphy, businessman 
Harold Johnson, sportscaster and candidate for this district in 2010

Endorsements

Primary results

Runoff results

General election

Endorsements

Polling

Debates
Complete video of debate, September 24, 2012

Predictions

Result

District 9
Republican Sue Myrick, who had represented North Carolina's 9th congressional district since 1995, did not seek another term.
Curtis Campbell ran as the Libertarian nominee.

Republican primary

Candidates

Nominee
Robert Pittenger, former state senator from the 39th district and nominee for Lieutenant Governor in 2008,

Eliminated in primary
Dan Barry, mayor pro tem of Weddington 
Andy Dulin, member of Charlotte City Council 
Jon Gauthier, financial adviser 
Ric Killian, former state representative
Ken Leonwyzk, lawyer and ordained minister
Richard Lynch, business owner
Edwin Peacock, member of Charlotte City Council
Jim Pendergraph, Mecklenburg County Commissioner 
Michael Steinberg, businessman

Withdrawn
Michael Schaffer, real estate broker (endorsed Barry)

Declined
Sue Myrick, incumbent U.S. Representative
Robert A. Rucho, state senator from the 39th district

In the Republican primary, Pittenger and Pendergraph qualified for the runoff election, earning 33% and 25% of the vote, respectively.  On July 17, Pittenger won the primary runoff.

Primary results

Runoff results

Democratic primary

Candidates

Nominee
Jennifer Roberts, Mecklenburg County Commissioner

Declined
Patrick Cannon, mayor pro tem of Charlotte

General election

Endorsements

Results

District 10
Republican Patrick McHenry, who has represented North Carolina's 10th congressional district since 2005, ran for re-election. Though the 10th district was made more favorable to Democrats in redistricting, it was expected to continue to strongly favor Republicans.

Republican primary

Candidates

Nominee
Patrick McHenry, incumbent U.S. Representative

Eliminated in primary
Ken Fortenberry, newspaper publisher 
Don Peterson

Primary results

Democratic primary

Candidates

Nominee
Patsy Keever, state representative

Eliminated in primary
Terry Bellamy, mayor of Asheville 
Timothy Murphy

Withdrawn
Heath Wynn, adjunct professor at Catawba Valley Community College

Primary results

General election

Endorsements

Results

District 11
Democrat Heath Shuler, who had represented North Carolina's 11th congressional district since 2007, chose not to run for re-election.
 The 11th district was made more favorable to Republicans in redistricting: more than three-quarters of voters in Asheville were removed from the district, while Avery, Burke, Caldwell and Mitchell counties, all of which favor Republicans, were added to it.

Democratic primary

Candidates

Nominee
Hayden Rogers, Rep. Shuler's former chief of staff

Eliminated in primary
Cecil Bothwell, Asheville city council-member 
Tom Hill, retired defense industry worker

Declined
Heath Shuler, incumbent U.S. Representative

Primary results

Republican primary

Candidates

Nominee
Mark Meadows, real estate investor

Eliminated in primary
Spence Campbell, retired U.S. Army colonel and nominee for this district in 2008
Susan Harris, accountant
Jeff Hunt, Henderson, Polk and Transylvania counties district attorney 
Vance Patterson, business owner and Tea Party member 
Chris Petrella, economic development consultant 
Kenny West, Clay County Republican Party chairman
Ethan Wingfield, businessman

Withdrawn
Dan Eichenbaum, ophthalmologist

Declined
Jeff Miller, businessman and nominee for this district in 2010

Primary results

Runoff results

General election

Endorsements

Predictions

Results

District 12
Democrat Mel Watt, who has represented North Carolina's 12th congressional district since 1993, ran for re-election. The 12th district was made more favorable to Democrats in redistricting.

Watt faced Republican Jack Brosch  and Libertarian Lon Cecil in the general election in November.

Democratic primary

Candidates

Nominee
Mel Watt, incumbent U.S. Representative

Eliminated in primary
Matt Newton, attorney and former Occupy movement protester

Declined
 Melvin Alston, Guilford County Commissioner

Primary results

Republican primary

Candidates

Nominee
 Jack Brosch, business owner

General election

Endorsements

Results

District 13
Democrat Brad Miller, who had represented North Carolina's 13th congressional district since 2003, did not seek re-election. The 13th district was made more favorable to Republicans in redistricting.

Democratic primary

Candidates

Nominee
Charles Malone, state employee and nominee for state senate's 15th district in 2010.

Eliminated in primary
Bernard Holliday, Baptist minister

Declined
Brad Miller, incumbent U.S. Representative

Primary results

Republican primary

Candidates

Nominee
George Holding, former U.S. Attorney for the Eastern District of North Carolina

Eliminated in primary
Paul Coble, Wake County Commissioner 
Bill Randall, U.S. Navy retiree and nominee for this district in 2010

Declined
Phil Berger, Jr, Rockingham County district attorney
B.J. Lawson, entrepreneur, chief software architect and nominee for the 4th district in 2008 and 2010;
Vernon Robinson, former Winston-Salem city council member and nominee for this district in 2006 (running in the 8th district)
Nathan Tabor, candidate for the 5th district in 2004;

Primary results

General election

Endorsements

Predictions

Results

See also
Gerrymandering

References

External links
North Carolina State Board of Elections
United States House of Representatives elections in North Carolina, 2012 at Ballotpedia
North Carolina U.S. House at OurCampaigns.com
Campaign contributions for U.S. Congressional races in North Carolina from OpenSecrets
Outside spending at the Sunlight Foundation

North Carolina
2012
United States House of Representatives